The GTRI Office of Policy Analysis and Research is a division of the Georgia Tech Research Institute that focuses on policy analysis, particularly in fields where GTRI has science and technology experience. OPAR assists the Georgia General Assembly and publishes briefs on relevant issues, including how other states treat various issues.

In particular, OPAR hosts an annual "Legislative Roundtable" that brings together interested state representatives, prominent members of Georgia industry, and Georgia Tech students and faculty.

References

External links
 Official website

Office of Policy Analysis and Research
Think tanks based in the United States
Science and technology think tanks